Danielson is an impact crater in the Oxia Palus quadrangle on Mars at 7.93° N and 7.11° W. and is 66.7 km in diameter, and is north of the Meridiani Planum, south of Arabia Terra. Its name was approved in 2009, and it was named after American engineer G. Edward Danielson.

Many close up images of the crater reveal multiple thin layers, some of which are broken by faults. The layers on the floor of Danielson may have been formed on the bottom of lakes.

Gallery

See also 
 List of craters on Mars

References

External links

Impact craters on Mars
Oxia Palus quadrangle